The Oba of Benin is the traditional ruler and the custodian of the culture of the Edo people and all Edoid people. The then Kingdom of Benin (not to be confused with the modern-day and unrelated Republic of Benin, which was then known as Dahomey). The Benin kingdom has continued to be mostly populated by the Edo (also known as Benin ethnic group).

In 1897, a British military force of approximately 1,200 men under the command of Sir Harry Rawson mounted the Benin punitive Expedition. The force was dispatched in retaliation to the ambush of a British party, at Ugbine village near Gwato on 4 January 1897 by a group of Benin soldiers who were acting without orders from the Oba; the ambush had led to the deaths of all but two of the British party. The British force captured the capital of the Kingdom of Benin, sacking and burning the city while forcing the Oba of Benin, Ovonramwen, into a six-month exile. The expeditionary force consisted of both indigenous soldiers and British officers based in colonial-era Nigeria. Numerous artworks (collectively known as the Benin Bronzes) looted from the city palace were sold off to defray the costs of the expedition. Ovonramwen died in 1914, his throne never having been restored to him. His son, grandson and now his great-grandson, however, has preserved their title and status as traditional rulers in modern-day Nigeria.

List of Obas of the Benin Kingdom

Pre-Imperial Benin (1180–1440)

 Eweka I (1180–1246)
 Uwuakhuahen (1246–1250)
 Henmihen (1250–1260)
 Ewedo (1260–1274)
 Oguola (1274–1287)
 Edoni (1287–1292)
 Akang (1292–1296)
 Udagbedo (1296–1329)
 Ohen (1329–1366)
 Egbeka (1366–1397)
 Orobiru (1397–1434)
 Uwaifiokun (1434–1440)
Source:

Imperial Benin  (1440–1897)

There is some uncertainty in the dates of the reigns of some of the earlier warrior kings
Ewuare I (1440–1473)
Ezoti (1473–1474)
Olua (1475–1480)
Ozolua (1480–1504)
Esigie (1504–1547)
Orhogbua (1547–1580)
Ehengbuda (1580–1602)
Ohuan (1602–1656)
Ohenzae (1656–1675)
Akenkpaye (1675–1684)
Akengbedo (1684–1689)
Ore-Oghene (1689–1701)
Ewuakpe (1701–1712)
Ozuere (1712–1713)
Akenzua I (1713–1740)
Eresoyen (1740–1750)
Akengbuda (1750–1804)
Obanosa (1804–1816)
Ogbebo (1816)
Osemwende (1816–1848)
Adolo (1848–1888)
Ovonramwen Nogbaisi (1888–1897)
Source:

Post-Imperial Benin
 Eweka II (1914–1933)
Akenzua II (1933–1978)
Erediauwa (1979–2016)
Ewuare II (2016–present)
Source:

See also
 Iyoba of Benin
 Ogiso
 Akenzua II

References

External links
Africa Reparations Movement | Campaign for the return of the Benin Bronzes
Stories of royalty in brass. Collections Multimedia Public Access System, The British Museum, 2000. Accessed 6 September 2006. 
"The Obas that ruled Benin after the Ogiso dynasty". Edofolks - List of Obas of Benin
Benin kingdom Obas 1200AD–Date (with photos) {source Edoworld}
Benin Monarchial system {source Edoworld}
Benin Traditional Temple and Cultural Center to the world
Royal Art of Benin: The Perls Collection, an exhibition catalog from The Metropolitan Museum of Art (fully available online as PDF), which contains material on several Obas of Benin

History of Nigeria
 
Nigeria-related lists
Edo people